was the founder of the Mitsui family of merchants and industrialists that later emerged as the Mitsui Group, a powerful Japanese zaibatsu (business conglomerate).

Life 
Mitsui was born in 1622, in Matsusaka, Ise Province (present-day Matsusaka, Mie Prefecture), the son of merchants Mitsui Takatoshi (三井 高俊) and Shuhō (殊法). He was the youngest of eight siblings; four brothers and four sisters. His grandfather was a samurai and Governor of Echigo Province Mitsui Takayasu, who was later exiled to Matsusaka after being defeated by Oda Nobunaga. Mitsui's father Takatoshi abandoned his katana, thus renouncing his status as a samurai, and established himself as a sake and miso merchant and a pawnbroker. The business was named "Lord Echigo's Sake" (Echigo-dono no sakaya) to commemorate Takayasu's office. However, Mitsui's mother Shuhō, a skilled merchant, was practically in charge of the business as her husband was not very fond of trading. She grew the business by introducing many business methods that were ground-breaking at the time, such as forfeited pawn and low-margin high-turnover. Mitsui, who later became a prosperous merchant, is said to have inherited his business skills mostly from his mother. The Mitsui family was a branch of Fujiwara Hokke.

He moved to Edo at 14 years of age, following his eldest brother Toshitsugu who had extended the family business by opening a kimono store (呉服屋, gofukuya) there in 1627. Takatoshi in a little over a decade rose to be manager of his brother's shop. 

In 1649, his elder brother Shigetoshi died at the age of 36, and he returned to Matsusaka to look after his aging mother, remaining there for two decades. There, he married Nakagawa Kane, the eldest daughter of the Nakagawa merchant family; the two had ten sons and five daughters. He returned to Edo on his elder brother Toshigutsu's death in 1673. He then established the Echigoya Drapery in Nihonbashi the following year, which was to become, later, the head company of the famous Mitsukoshi retail shopping chain. He also set up a material supplies store in Kyoto at this time. In contrast to most drapery merchants, who catered to feudal houses and wealthy merchants, trading on credit with no fixed prices, Takatoshi introduced an innovatory system of cash based purchase based on fixed prices for wares and targeted consumers in the emerging middle class.

He subsequently started a money exchange in 1683, with a new system for inter-city loans: he extended the family business by opening an outlet in Osaka, and was appointed official purveyor of dry goods to the Tokugawa shogunate in 1687.  He also relocated, in 1686, the headquarters of the family business from Matsusaka to Kyoto.  He died at the age of 73.

Mitsui had six sons.

Notes

Citations

Sources

1622 births
1694 deaths
Japanese businesspeople
Mitsui family
People from Matsusaka, Mie